The Gwalior Metro is a  proposed rapid transit system to serve  Gwalior, Gwalior West and other nearby towns in Gwalior Metropolitan Region in the Indian state of Madhya Pradesh. The project was announced by current state Chief Minister Shivraj Singh Chouhan on 17 October 2014. The survey has been started. It is so far the third metro system proposed in the Indian state of Madhya Pradesh after Indore Metro, and Bhopal Metro.The network consists of three colour-coded regular lines proposed to serve 21 stations with a total length of 58.1 kilometres (36.1 mi). The system will have a mix of underground, at-grade, and elevated stations using standard-gauge tracks.

Madhya Pradesh Metro Rail Corporation, a company developed under the Government of Madhya Pradesh, will build and operate the Gwalior Metro.

History 
The Union Minister Jyotiraditya Scindia had demanded metro train for the Gwalior city, he had written to the present Chief Minister of Madhya Pradesh, Shivraj Singh Chauhan. As the state government have started work of metro train in Bhopal and in Indore, the leader from Gwalior Chambal region had raised the demand to set up the metro train facility in Gwalior. In his letter he stated that the Gwalior city is facing huge traffic pressure and to reduce the pressure it needs metro train. He asked the CM to institute a team which can conduct a feasibility study to establish the metro in the city. He had also written to the district collector to forward the letter to the department.

The concept of a mass rapid transit for Gwalior first emerged from a traffic and travel characteristics study which was carried out in the city in 1992 when the satellite district of Gwalior-West was getting developed under National Capital Region to attract the population of Delhi and act as a Counter Magnet for Delhiites. Gwalior was first city out of 5 Counter Magnets selected by the government. Gwalior West lies 15 km from Gwalior and 8 km east of the Tigra Dam. 

From several years, many official committees by a variety of Government departments were commissioned to examine issues related to technology, route alignment, and Governmental jurisdiction. On 17 October 2014 the project of developing a rapid transit metro rail system in Gwalior was announced by current state Chief Minister Shivraj Singh Chouhan.

While extensive technical studies and the raising of finance for the project are in progress, the city expanded significantly resulting in a 15.2174% increase   in population between 2014 and 2020. Consequently, traffic congestion and pollution soared, as an increasing number of commuters took to private vehicles as there was no proper transportation system in the city other than auto rickshaw, this merely compounded the problem with inexperienced operators plying poorly maintained, noisy and polluting buses on lengthy routes, resulting in long waiting times, unreliable service, extreme overcrowding, unqualified drivers, speeding and reckless driving which even led to road accidents. To rectify the situation, the Government of Madhya Pradesh set up a company called the Madhya Pradesh Metro Rail Corporation with Shri. Ranjit Singh Deol, Indian Administrative Service as the managing director.

Network 
The Gwalior Metro is being built in phases. It has been found out that it will be built in 3 Phases out of which the 1st Phase is in Planning Stage. The network consists of Three colour-coded regular lines proposed to serve 21 stations with a total length of 58.1 kilometers (36.1 mi). The system will have a mix of underground, at-grade, and elevated stations using standard-gauge tracks.

Proposed lines

Red Line (Line 1) 
The  will be the initial line of the Metro to be opened and will connect Gwalior Airport in the North to Sithouli Railway Station in the South, i.e. it will act to provide North-South Connectivity across Gwalior City, covering a distance of 30.3 kilometres (18.82 mi) and is the longest line (projected). It is the most important line as it will connect the Airport to the Gwalior Railway Station and Satellite Railway Station of Sithouli. The  will be partly elevated and partly at grade and will cross the Gwalior Railway Station of the Indian-Railways between Gole Ka Mandir and Phool Bagh stations. It will be Elevated from Gwalior Airport Metro Station to Phool Bagh Metro Station after which, near DD Mall the next stretch from Jayendraganj Chowk Metro Station to Kampoo Metro Station it will be built underground due to the heavy Population Density around the area. Then the corridor will be built elevated from Gudagudi ka Naka which will help transit to the nearby Agra Bombay Road (AB Road), just 6.3 Km from it.

Blue Line (Line 2) {Ring Line} 
The Blue Line will be the second line of the Metro to be opened and the first to connect areas in Congested Parts of Central Gwalior in a Box-Ring Shape manner. Half elevated and half underground, it will connect Jiwaji University Circle (City-Center Chaurah) in the East with the Sub-City of Kampoo in the West, providing an east–west connectivity across Gwalior City covering a distance of 22.7 kilometres (14.1 mi). It will be the most used line of Gwalior Metro by Gwaliorites as it passes form most densely populates places of the city and major markets. The first section of this line between Jiwaji University and Govindpuri will be built on elevated racks and subsequent section between Govindpuri –  7 Number Chauraha will be underground due to unavailability of land. From Gole Ka Mandir it will reach its terminal station Kampoo through Jiwaji Ganj .

Yellow Line (Line 3) 
The Yellow Line will be the third line of the Metro. It will run for 5.1 kilometres (3.16 mi) from Central Gwalior to South West Gwalior and will connect Jayendraganj with Scindi Colony in Gwalior. Presently, it is the shortest projected line in Gwalior. It will help to connect Central Gwalior with the South-Western Scindi Colony and the Nearby Agra Bombay Road (Bypass) which is also a National Highway.

Route map 
A Detailed Explanation Model and DPR for the routes has been presented by a Youtuber RoastFlix in his Recent Video which are up-to date and can be referred for additional visualisation. The route maps can be found here:

 Map

 Map

 Map

Proposed stations

Red Line (Line 1) 
1.Gwalior Airport

2.DD Nagar

3.Gole Ka Mandir

4.Gwalior Railway Station

5.Phool Bagh

6.Jayendra Ganj

7.Kampoo

8.Gudagudi Ka Naka 

9.Sithouli Railway Station

Blue Line (Line 2) 
1.Jiwaji University

2.Govindpuri

3.DB City

4.Baradari, Morar

5.7 Number Chaurah

6.Gole Ka Mandir

7.Hazira

8.Urwai Gate-Gwalior Fort

9.Jiwaji Ganj

10.Kampoo

Yellow Line (Line 3) 
1.Jayendra Ganj

2.Scindi Colony

Signalling and telecommunication 
The Gwalior Metro will use cab signalling along with a centralised automatic train control system consisting of automatic operation, protection and signalling modules. A 380 MHz digital trunked TETRA radio communication system from Motorola Solutions is used on all lines to carry both voice and data information. For Blue Line Siemens Mobility will supply the electronic interlocking Sicas, the operation control system Vicos OC 500 and the automation control system LZB 700 M. An integrated system comprising optical fibre cable, on-train radio, CCTV, and a centralised clock and public address system is used for telecommunication during train operations as well as emergencies. For Red and Yellow lines ALSTOM has supplied signalling system.

https://dainik-b.in/VudxzvG2e7

References

3. https://indiarailinfo.com/news/post/now-metro-train-will-coming-gwalior-stoppage-at-every-500-meter-in-gwalior-www-bhaskar-com-indian-railways-news/275009

4. https://www.patrika.com/gwalior-news/metro-will-be-start-in-gwalior-and-jabalpur-railway-will-survey-for-this-1469580/

5. https://dainik-b.in/VudxzvG2e7

6. https://www.patrika.com/gwalior-news/metro-train-1-5216950/
Proposed rapid transit in India
Transport in Gwalior